Common Voice is a crowdsourcing project started by Mozilla to create a free database for speech recognition software. The project is supported by volunteers who record sample sentences with a microphone and review recordings of other users. The transcribed sentences will be collected in a voice database available under the public domain license CC0. This license ensures that developers can use the database for voice-to-text applications without restrictions or costs.

Aims
Common Voice aims to provide diverse voice samples. According to Mozilla's Katharina Borchert, many existing projects took datasets from public radio or otherwise had datasets that underrepresented both women and people with pronounced accents.

History 
At the beginning of 2022, the Bengali.AI partnered with commonvoice to launch "Bangla Speech Recognition" project that aims to make machines understand Bangla language. 2000 hours of voice was collected with aim for higher than 10,000 hours.

Voice database
The first dataset was released in November 2017. More than 20,000 users worldwide had recorded 500 hours of English sentences.

In February 2019, the first batch of languages was released for use. This included 18 languages: English, French, German and Mandarin Chinese, but also less prevalent languages as Welsh and Kabyle. In total, this included almost 1,400 hours of recorded voice data from more than 42,000 contributors.

As of July 2020 the database has amassed 7,226 hours of voice recordings in 54 languages, 5,591 hours of which has been verified by volunteers.

In May 2021, following the work to add Kinyarwanda, they received a grant to add Kiswahili.

In September 2022, it was announced that the Twi language of Ghana was the 100th language to be added to the Mozilla Common Voice database.

As of October 2022, Mozilla Common Voice officially collects voice data for the following languages:

 Abkhaz
 Arabic
 Armenian
 Assamese
 Asturian
 Bashkir
 Basaa
 Basque
 Belarusian
 Bengali
 Breton
 Bulgarian
 Catalan
 Chinese (Cantonese and Mandarin varieties)
 Chuvash
 Czech 
 Danish
 Dhivehi
 Dutch
 English
 Esperanto
 Erzya
 Finnish 
 French 
 Frisian
 Galician
 Georgian
 German 
 Greek 
 Guaraní
 Hausa
 Hakha Chin
 Hindi 
 Hungarian 
 Indonesian 
 Interlingua
 Irish
 Italian
 Japanese
 Kabyle
 Kazakh
 Kinyarwanda
 Korean
 Kurdish (Central and Kurmanji varieties)
 Kyrgyz
 Latvian
 Luganda
 Macedonian
 Malayalam
 Maltese
 Marathi
 Mari (Meadow and Hill varieties)
 Moksha
 Mongolian
 Nepali
 Norwegian (Nynorsk)
 Odia
 Persian
 Polish 
 Portuguese
 Punjabi
 Romanian 
 Romansh (Sursilvan and Vallader varieties)
 Russian 
 Sakha 
 Santali
 Saraiki
 Sardinian
 Serbian
 Slovenian
 Spanish 
 Swahili
 Swedish 
 Taiwanese Hokkien
 Tamil
 Tatar
 Thai
 Tigre
 Tigrinya
 Toki Pona
 Twi
 Turkish
 Upper Sorbian
 Ukrainian
 Urdu
 Uyghur
 Uzbek
 Vietnamese
 Votic
 Welsh

See also 

 Forvo
 Lingua Libre
 Crowdsource (app)

References

Speech recognition software
Datasets in machine learning